Baseraa is an Indian Bollywood film. The film was produced by Ramesh Behl, and directed by Ramesh Talwar. The film based on Marathi novel by Leela Phansalkar. It stars Shashi Kapoor, Raakhee, Rekha, Raj Kiran, Poonam Dhillon in lead roles. The music was composed by R. D. Burman. The movie was a hit at the box office and the lead actor's performance was much praised.

The film was remade in Telugu as Thodu Needa (1983), in Tamil as Kanmaniye Pesu (1986), in Malayalam as Nirabhedam(1987) and in Kannada as Suvvi Suvvalaali(1998).

Plot

Nima and Balraj Kohli are a happily married middle-aged couple, living in a rich neighborhood of Pune. They have two sons, Sagar and Babbu. Sagar falls in love with medico Sarita and they get engaged. It is revealed that Nima is Balraj's second wife and not the biological mother of Sagar. Balraj is the husband of Sharada, Nima's elder sister. When the newly married Nima had lost her husband in an accident, a shocked Sharada fell down the stairs, damaging her head. She is in a mental institution in Mumbai for the past 14 years. Over the years, with no hopes of Sharada's recovery, Balraj and Nima married.

When Sharada gets hit on her head by an inmate of the institution, she suddenly comes out of her coma. While the doctor explains to her that she was in a comatose state for the past 14 years but does not reveal that Balraj and Nima are married. As Sharada heads home, alerted by the doctor, Nima arranges everything to look like it was 14 years ago, making herself up like a widow, and sending Babbu to stay with Sarita. Balraj is happy to see Sharada recovered but sad to see Nima in a widow's attire. They maintain things in that way for some time for fear that Sharada will fall ill again if she learns the truth.

When Nima's son Babbu escapes from Sarita's hostel, the truth is revealed to Sharada. Shocked, she loses consciousness and becomes violent on regaining it. Balraj and Nima are forced to send her back to the mental institution. Sarita, while trying to pacify her, realizes that Sharada is play acting to be crazy to exit from her family. Sharada extracts a promise from her to keep it secret.

Cast
Shashi Kapoor as Balraj Kohli
Raakhee as Sharda Kohli
Rekha as Purnima Kohli
Raj Kiran as Sagar Kohli
Poonam Dhillon as Sarita Sethi
A. K. Hangal as Sharda and Purnima's father
Iftekhar as Doctor Gokhle
Master Vikas as Babbu
Sudha Chopra as Mrs. Sethi
Mrs. H.F. Mistry as ladies hostel matron
Raj Kumar Kapoor as Dr. Gupta
Gulshan Bawra as Mukul

Music
The score was composed by R. D. Burman. The lyrics were penned by Gulzar. Songs were sung by playback singers Lata Mangeshkar, Asha Bhosle and Kishore Kumar.

Trivia
Rekha played Raj Kiran's mother in the film, despite being six years younger than him in real life.

Awards

 29th Filmfare Awards:

Nominated

 Best Film – Rose Movies
 Best Director – Ramesh Talwar
 Best Actress – Raakhee
 Best Lyricist – Gulzar for "Jahaan Pe Savera"
 Best Story – Leela Phansalkar

External links 
 

1981 films
1980s Hindi-language films
Films scored by R. D. Burman
Hindi films remade in other languages
Films with screenplays by Gulzar
Rose Audio Visuals
Films directed by Ramesh Talwar
Indian drama films